Sir Ernest Joseph Cassel,  (3 March 1852 – 21 September 1921) was a British merchant banker and capitalist. Born and raised in Prussia, he moved to England at the age of 17.

Life and career

Cassel was born in Cologne, in the Rhine Province of the Kingdom of Prussia (now part of Germany), the son of Amalia (née Rosenheim) and Jacob Cassel. His family were Ashkenazi Jews.  His father owned a small bank, but the son Ernest arrived penniless in Liverpool, England in 1869.  There he found employment with a firm of grain merchants. With an enormous capacity for hard work and a strong business sense, Cassel was soon in Paris working for a bank. Being of Prussian origin, the Franco-Prussian War forced him to move to a position in a London bank. He prospered and was soon putting together his own financial deals. 

His areas of interest were in mining, infrastructure and heavy industry.  Turkey was an early area of business ventures, but he soon had large interests in Sweden, the United States, South America, South Africa, and Egypt. He was among the financiers of the Aswan Dam built in Egypt between 1899 and 1902, and was present in Egypt for the opening of the dam in December 1902.

At the behest of the French and British governments, he reluctantly provided assistance for the establishment of the State Bank of Morocco, provided for in the terms of the 1906 Treaty of Algeciras.

In 1912 his close German friend Albert Ballin feared that the naval rivalry between Britain and Germany was getting out of hand and even threatened war. They approach their respective governments, who agreed to negotiate a compromise that would end the race through the Haldane Mission of 1912. Unfortunately, it proved a failure.

One of the wealthiest men of his day, Cassel was a good friend of King Edward VII (enough so that he was nicknamed "Windsor Cassel"), prime minister H. H. Asquith and Winston Churchill. As a foreign-born arriviste of Jewish background, he was less than popular with elements of the British upper crust.

Retirement

Cassel retired from business in 1910. His philanthropic benefactions included £500,000 for educational purposes, £225,000 for a hospital for nervous diseases and £50,000 to King Edward's Hospital Fund in memory of his only child. He built and endowed an Anglo-German Institute in 1911 in memory of King Edward VII.

During the First World War Cassel made large financial gifts to the British Red Cross and other war time charitable entities working to ameliorate privation being suffered by British military casualties.

Cassel had a famous art collection and many beautiful houses. He bred racehorses and owned Moulton Paddocks in Newmarket.

Family
Cassel was married at Westminster, in 1878, to Annette Mary Maud Maxwell, the daughter of a Catholic landowner. Their only child, Amalia Mary Maud Cassel (1880–1911), known as "Maud", married Wilfrid Ashley, 1st Baron Mount Temple.

After the early death of his wife Annette in 1881 he and his widowed sister Wilhelmina (known as Bobbie) helped each other bring up his daughter (Maud) and Wilhelmina's son (Felix) and daughter (Anna).

Maud died as a young woman, leaving him two granddaughters (Edwina and Mary) on whom he doted. He was particularly attached to Edwina, who looked after him in his old age. She later married Lord Louis Mountbatten.

Cassel's nephew was the barrister Sir Felix Cassel, who later became Judge Advocate-General to the Forces.

Cassel became a Roman Catholic at the behest of his wife, but many still considered him a Jew. The establishment was surprised to find out that he had converted when he chose to be sworn into the Privy Council with the Douay–Rheims Bible.

Honours

Cassel's friendship with the King and achievements in international finance earned him many British and foreign honours.  Contemporary society gossip suggested that he demanded these as a return for his services. In 1899, he was made a Knight Commander of the Order of St Michael and St George (KCMG). In 1901, he was made a Knight Commander of the Royal Victorian Order (KCVO).

He was sworn a member of the Privy Council on 11 August 1902, following an announcement of the King's intention to make this appointment in the 1902 Coronation Honours list published in June that year. In 1905, he was promoted to Knight Grand Cross of the Order of St Michael and St George (GCMG)
 and, in 1906, he was promoted to Knight Grand Cross of the Royal Victorian Order (GCVO). In the 1909 Birthday Honours, he was made a Knight Grand Cross of the Order of the Bath (GCB).

Awards received in thanks for services to foreign governments included Commander, first class, of the Royal Order of Vasa in 1900 from Sweden, the Grand Cordon of the Imperial Ottoman Order of Osmanieh in December 1902 while visiting Egypt for the opening of the Assuan dam, Commander of the Légion d'honneur in 1906 from France, the Order of the Crown, first class, in 1908 from Prussia, the Grand Cross of the Order of the Polar Star in 1909 from Sweden, the Order of the Rising Sun, first class, in 1911 from Japan and the Order of the Red Eagle, first class with brilliants in 1913 from Prussia.

Legacy

In 1919, Cassel founded and endowed the Cassel Hospital, originally at Swaylands near Penshurst, and now at No. 1 Ham Common, Ham, near Richmond, London. The hospital is a therapeutic community for the mentally ill, providing residential, day and outreach services, part of the NHS.

Death
Cassel died at Brook House, Park Lane, London. His body was buried in Kensal Green Cemetery.

Cassel's estate was valued at his death at £7,333,411 gross and £6,000,000 (equivalent to £ today) for probate.  A 2001 study of probate records put the value at £7,333,000

See also
National Bank of Egypt
National Bank of Turkey

References

Further reading
 "Sir Ernest Cassel" The Economic Journal (Dec 1921) 31#124 DOI: 10.1093/ej/31.124.557
 Grunwald, Kurt. "“Windsor-Cassel”-The Last Court Jew: Prolegomena to a Biography of Sir Ernest Cassel." Leo Baeck Institute Yearbook 14.1 (1969): 119-161.
 Massie, Robert K. Dreadnought: Britain, Germany, and the coming of the Great War (1991) pp. 792-817.
 Sleightholme‐Albanis, Elisabeth. "Sir Ernest Cassel and Anglo‐German relations before the outbreak of the First World War." Cambridge Review of International Affairs 4.2 (1990): 36-43.
 Thane, Pat. "Financiers and the British state: the case of Sir Ernest Cassel." Business History 28.1 (1986): 80-99.

External links

Sir Ernest Cassel Educational Trust
Biography at Pro Natura Center Aletsch, Villa Cassel, CH-3987 Riederalp
 

English bankers
English racehorse owners and breeders
Converts to Roman Catholicism from Judaism
English people of German-Jewish descent
English Roman Catholics
English art collectors
German emigrants to England
Members of the Privy Council of the United Kingdom
Naturalised citizens of the United Kingdom
1852 births
1921 deaths
Businesspeople from Cologne
Burials at Kensal Green Cemetery
Knights Grand Cross of the Order of the Bath
Knights Grand Cross of the Order of St Michael and St George
Knights Grand Cross of the Royal Victorian Order
Commandeurs of the Légion d'honneur
Commanders First Class of the Order of Vasa
Commanders Grand Cross of the Order of the Polar Star
Grand Cordons of the Order of the Rising Sun
19th-century German Jews
People from the Rhine Province